Emery Davis Potter (October 7, 1804 – February 12, 1896) was an American lawyer and politician who served two non-consecutive terms as a U.S. Representative from Ohio in the mid-19th century.

Biography 
Born in Providence, Rhode Island, Potter attended the district school and the academy in Herkimer County, New York.
He studied law in Cooperstown, New York with John Adams Dix, later a senator and governor.
He was admitted to the New York State bar at Utica in 1833 and commenced practice in Cooperstown, New York.
He moved to Toledo, Ohio, in 1834 and continued the practice of law, opening the first office in that city.
He served as judge of the circuit court for the northern counties of Ohio.
He served as president judge of the court of common pleas from 1834 to 1843, when he resigned.

Congress 
Potter was elected as a Democrat to the Twenty-eighth Congress (March 4, 1843 – March 3, 1845).
He was not a candidate for renomination.
He served as mayor of Toledo 1846–1848.
He served as member of the State house of representatives 1848–1850.

Potter was elected to the Thirty-first Congress (March 4, 1849 – March 3, 1851).
He served as chairman of the Committee on Post Office and Post Roads (Thirty-first Congress).
He was not a candidate for renomination.

Later career 
He resumed the practice of law in Toledo.
He declined the appointment of judge of the Territory of Utah in 1858.
City solicitor of Toledo in 1861 and 1862.
He served as member of the board of education in 1864 and 1865.
He served as member of the State senate 1874–1876 and served as president.
He retired from active practice in 1880.

Death
He died in Toledo, Ohio, February 12, 1896.
He was interred in Forest Cemetery.

Private life 
Potter was married in 1843 to Mary A Card of Willoughby, Ohio who died in 1847, and left a son, Emery D. Potter, Jr.  He later married Anna B. Milliken of Pennsylvania, who had a daughter called Anna Claire Potter. He was six feet two inches tall (1.88 m), and of large frame.

Sources

1804 births
1896 deaths
Democratic Party members of the Ohio House of Representatives
Politicians from Providence, Rhode Island
Mayors of Toledo, Ohio
New York (state) lawyers
Ohio lawyers
Presidents of the Ohio State Senate
Democratic Party Ohio state senators
19th-century American politicians
Burials in Ohio
Democratic Party members of the United States House of Representatives from Ohio
19th-century American lawyers